Thor Steinar is a German clothing brand manufactured by Thor Steinar Mediatex GmbH, a subsidiary of International Brands General Trading, a Dubai-based company.

In Germany, the brand is considered closely associated to neo-Nazism by the Verfassungschutz of the state of Brandenburg.<ref>[http://www.verfassungsschutz.brandenburg.de/cms/detail.php/bb2.c.423435.de Scene costumes for right-wing extremists], from the official Web pages of the state of Brandenburg (in German).</ref> In German media, the brand is most often discussed in the light of this association. Wearing Thor Steinar clothes is expressly forbidden in the Bundestag, the Landtages of Mecklenburg-Vorpommern and Saxony, and in several football stadiums.

History
The brand was registered as a trademark by Axel Kopelke in October 2002 and was manufactured by Mediatex GmbH. In March 2009, Mediatex sold the brand to International Brands General Trading, a Dubai-based company.

 Controversy 

Since the inception of Thor Steinar, the company has used two logos. Much of the controversy regarding the clothing label revolves around their first logo, featuring a combination of a *tiwaz rune and a *sowilo rune: the runes were so combined that a part of the logo became very similar to the wolfsangel which is used by some organisations with neo-Nazi connections. It was also used by the Nazis as exemplified by the insignia of the 2nd SS Panzer Division Das Reich. In addition there is some similarity to the insignia of the Schutzstaffel.
The manufacturers of the Thor Steinar brand rejected this interpretation of the original logo.

Their second logo is a Gyfu rune, similar in appearance to a saltire, and has not caused controversy. This rune is known as an apolitical symbol given its historical relationship to pre-Christian mythology.

On occasions, Thor Steinar shops have been attacked with stones or paint bombs.

Germany
In Germany, public display of Nazi-associated symbols, as well as glorification of Adolf Hitler and denial of the Holocaust, are illegal (under Strafgesetzbuch section 86a and Strafgesetzbuch paragraph 130, respectively). Despite that, the Federal Office for the Protection of the Constitution, which collects domestic intelligence for the government, appraises the number of active participants of the far-right movement at around 40,000.

Various authorities and organizations, including  Brandenburg Verfassungsschutz,Verfassungsschutzbericht Brandenburg 2007 , p. 162 have identified the wearing of Thor Steinar clothes as one of the indications of membership in the far-right subculture.

Wearing the label is prohibited in the German Bundestag and in the Landtags of Mecklenburg-Vorpommern and Saxony. In addition, several football clubs including Tennis Borussia Berlin, Borussia Dortmund, Werder Bremen, Hamburger SV and Hertha BSC prohibit wearing the label in their stadiums.HSV-Presseservice (28 September 2007). "Thor Steinar" und "Consdaple"-Kleidung in der HSH Nordbank Arena ab sofort verboten. The online retailer Amazon stopped selling the brand in 2009. Despite this, Amazon has since been criticized for employing internal security guards with far-right connections who wore the same clothing.

Norway
Various designs by Thor Steinar have had Norwegian flags and Norwegian names, such as Trondheim, Nordfjord, Nordstrand or Bergen. The official stores selling the clothes are also named after the oldest Norwegian city, Tønsberg. The government filed a complaint against the use of the Norwegian flag in February 2008. The legal complaint however failed and it is unlikely that a second attempt will be made. The Norwegian Embassy, the Norwegian Office for Foreign Affairs were informed by Mediatex – the company behind the Thor Steinar brand – in December 2007 that future collections starting and including the spring and summer 2008 collection will no longer use the national symbol of Norway. The company issued a statement in response to the issue.

Brevik store
Until 2008, the chain operated a store named Brevik, for the town Brevik in Telemark, Norway. In February 2012, Thor Steinar opened a new store in Chemnitz also with the name Brevik''. Its similarity to the last name of Anders Behring Breivik (who committed the July 2011 Norway attacks) in conjunction with his far-right politics led to public outcry and local authorities sought to have the store closed. The store was eventually renamed to Tønsberg in March 2012.

See also
 Nazi chic

References

External links
 Official website

Clothing brands of Germany
Products introduced in 2002
Neo-Nazism in Germany